Cristina Teuscher (born March 12, 1978) is an American former freestyle and medley swimmer who was a member of the U.S. women's relay team that won the gold medal in the 4×200-meter freestyle at the 1996 Summer Olympics in Atlanta, Georgia.  Her winning teammates were Jenny Thompson, Trina Jackson and Sheila Taormina. Four years later, while captain of the U.S. women's team, she captured the bronze medal in the 200-meter individual medley at the 2000 Summer Olympics in Sydney, Australia.

Teuscher is a 1996 graduate of New Rochelle High School and a 2000 graduate of Columbia University, where she was an All-American and four-time NCAA champion for the Columbia Lions swimming and diving team.  She won 12 Ivy League titles, set 17 team records, and received the 1997–98 Honda Sports Award for Swimming and Diving, recognizing her as the outstanding college female swimmer of the year.

She later completed her MBA at INSEAD in 2007. She followed Yale legend Frank Keefe as head coach of Yale Women's Swimming from 2010 to 2012. During her short tenure as head coach, the Bulldogs finished fifth and third in the Ivy League, respectively. Teuscher is on the board of directors for the Collegiate Women's Sports Awards.

See also
 List of Olympic medalists in swimming (women)
 List of World Aquatics Championships medalists in swimming (women)

References

External links
 

1978 births
Living people
American female medley swimmers
American female freestyle swimmers
Columbia Lions women's swimmers
Columbia College (New York) alumni
Olympic bronze medalists for the United States in swimming
Olympic gold medalists for the United States in swimming
Pan American Games gold medalists for the United States
Pan American Games silver medalists for the United States
Sportspeople from New Rochelle, New York
Sportspeople from the Bronx
Swimmers at the 1995 Pan American Games
Swimmers at the 1996 Summer Olympics
Swimmers at the 2000 Summer Olympics
World Aquatics Championships medalists in swimming
Medalists at the 2000 Summer Olympics
Medalists at the 1996 Summer Olympics
Pan American Games medalists in swimming
Yale Bulldogs swimming coaches
Medalists at the 1995 Pan American Games
New Rochelle High School alumni
20th-century American women